The Nakayama Daishogai (中山大障害) is a Group 1 steeplechase horse race in Japan open to thoroughbreds which are three-years-old or above. It is run over a distance of 4100m (2 miles + 84 feet) at Nakayama Racecourse every year in late December. It is one of Japan's two Group 1 jump races of the year, the other being the Nakayama Grand Jump.

Inaugurated as the Daishogai Tokubetsu in 1934, the Nakayama Daishogai had originally been run twice annually, once in the spring and once at the end of the year. In 1999, the spring race was discontinued and replaced by the Nakayama Grand Jump. The 144th running of the Daishogai was held in 2021.

Winners since 1999 

*There were two runnings of the Nakayama Daishogai in 2004, as the 2003 race was originally postponed due to weather.

References

External links
 Nakayama Daishogai at the Japan Association for International Racing and Stud Book website

Horse races in Japan
Steeplechase (horse racing)